Rain Forest is an album by the flautist Jeremy Steig and the double bass player Eddie Gómez recorded in New York in 1980 and released on the German CMP label.

Reception

The AllMusic review by Michael G. Nastos says, "Virtuoso flute player. An improvisational tradition of various groupings."

Track listing
All compositions by Jeremy Steig except where noted 
 "Dugnafied" − 5:20
 "Rhumbline" (Gomez) − 6:20
 "Sacrifice" − 6:47
 "Rain Forest" (Gomez) − 4:48
 "Amazon Express" − 3:15
 "Rosa" (Gomez) − 3:44
 "Carnival Sonata" (Gomez, Steig) − 5:40

Personnel
Jeremy Steig – flute, bass flute, digital delay Mu-Tron biphase, Mu-Tron octave divider
Eddie Gómez − double bass
Mike Nock − electric piano, synthesizer (tracks 2-4 & 6)
Karl Ratzer − electric guitar (track 1)
Jack DeJohnette (tracks 2 & 3), Steve Gadd (tracks 1 & 4) – drums
Naná Vasconcelos − cuíca, berimbau, talking drum, shaker, cowbell, triangle, tambourine (tracks 3-5 & 7)
Ray Barretto − congas (tracks 3 & 7)

References

Jeremy Steig albums
Eddie Gómez albums
1980 albums
Albums recorded at Electric Lady Studios
Collaborative albums